Rowton is a civil parish in Cheshire West and Chester, England.  It contains four buildings that are recorded in the National Heritage List for England as designated listed buildings, all of which are listed at Grade II.  This grade is the lowest of the three gradings given to listed buildings and is applied to "buildings of national importance and special interest".  Apart from the village of Rowton, the parish is rural.  The listed buildings consist of two farmhouses, farmbuildings, and a semi-derelict building that has a traditional association with the Civil War.

References

Listed buildings in Cheshire West and Chester
Lists of listed buildings in Cheshire